Synchalara malacobryas is a moth in the family Xyloryctidae. It was described by Edward Meyrick in 1938. It is found on New Guinea.

References

Synchalara
Moths described in 1938
Taxa named by Edward Meyrick